Thomas Brownlee was a New Zealand professional rugby league footballer who played in the 1910s. He played at representative level for New Zealand (Heritage № 70), and Thames, as a forward (prior to the specialist positions of), during the era of contested scrums.

International honours
Brownlee represented New Zealand in 1912 on their tour of Australia and also played for Thames. Thames was a sub-league of the Auckland Rugby League at the time.

Death
Thomas Brownlee was killed in a work related accident in 1945 after being electrocuted.

References

External links

Search for "Brownlee" at rugbyleagueproject.org

New Zealand national rugby league team players
New Zealand rugby league players
Place of birth missing
Place of death missing
Thames rugby league team players
Rugby league forwards
1886 births
1950 deaths